Ulvingen Island is one of the uninhabited islands in Qikiqtaaluk Region, Nunavut, Canada. It is located in Norwegian Bay between Axel Heiberg Island and Ellesmere Island's Raanes Peninsula. It is a member of the Sverdrup Islands, Queen Elizabeth Islands, and the Arctic Archipelago. Hare Point is situated at the island's southern tip.

References

External links
 Ulvingen Island in the Atlas of Canada - Toporama; Natural Resources Canada

Islands of the Queen Elizabeth Islands
Sverdrup Islands
Uninhabited islands of Qikiqtaaluk Region